Dita Hebelková (born 4 April 1976) is a former Czech mountain runner who won 1998 World Mountain Running Championships.

References

External links
 Dita Hebelková profile at Association of Road Racing Statisticians

1976 births
Living people
Place of birth missing (living people)
Czech mountain runners
World Mountain Running Championships winners